Rodolfo Orlandini (1 January 1905 – 24 December 1990) was an Argentine football (soccer) midfielder who played for the Argentina national team between 1927 and 1930.

Club career
Orlandini played club football in Argentina for Sportivo Buenos Aires and Estudiantil Porteño before moving to Italy in 1930 to play for Genoa C.F.C. In 1936 he moved to France where he played for Nice.

International career
Orlandini played in the 1928 Olympic football tournament where Argentina came second to Uruguay. In 1929 he played in the Copa América which was won by Argentina. He also participated in the first ever World Cup in 1930, where Argentina again finished second behind Uruguay.

Managerial career
After retiring as a player Orlandini went on to become a manager, he coached the Colombia national team during the qualifiers for the 1958 World Cup.

References

External links
 
 
 Enciclopedia del Calcio profile 

1905 births
1990 deaths
Footballers from Buenos Aires
Argentine people of Italian descent
Argentine footballers
1930 FIFA World Cup players
Genoa C.F.C. players
OGC Nice players
Footballers at the 1928 Summer Olympics
Olympic footballers of Argentina
Olympic silver medalists for Argentina
Argentina international footballers
Argentine expatriate footballers
Expatriate footballers in France
Expatriate footballers in Italy
Argentine expatriate sportspeople in France
Argentine expatriate sportspeople in Italy
Serie A players
Serie B players
Argentine football managers
El Salvador national football team managers
Ecuador national football team managers
Olympic medalists in football
Colombia national football team managers
Unión Magdalena managers
C.D. Águila managers
Expatriate football managers in Colombia
Expatriate football managers in Ecuador
Expatriate football managers in El Salvador
Medalists at the 1928 Summer Olympics
Association football midfielders